Various types of stability may be discussed for the solutions of differential equations or difference equations describing dynamical systems. The most important type is that concerning the stability of solutions near to a point of equilibrium. This may be discussed by the theory of Aleksandr Lyapunov. In simple terms, if the solutions that start out near an equilibrium point  stay near  forever, then  is Lyapunov stable. The notion of exponential stability guarantees a minimal rate of decay, i.e., an estimate of how quickly the solutions converge. The idea of Lyapunov stability can be extended to infinite-dimensional manifolds, where it is known as structural stability, which concerns the behavior of different but "nearby" solutions to differential equations. Input-to-state stability (ISS) applies Lyapunov notions to systems with inputs.

Lyapunov stability theory has no application to conservative systems such as the restricted three-body problem which do not exhibit asymptotic stability.

History
Lyapunov stability is named after Aleksandr Mikhailovich Lyapunov, a Russian mathematician who defended the thesis The General Problem of Stability of Motion at Kharkov University in 1892. A. M. Lyapunov was a pioneer in successful endeavors to develop a global approach to the analysis of the stability of nonlinear dynamical systems by comparison with the widely spread local method of linearizing them about points of equilibrium. His work, initially published in Russian and then translated to French, received little attention for many years. The mathematical theory of stability of motion, founded by A. M. Lyapunov, considerably anticipated the time for its implementation in science and technology. Moreover Lyapunov did not himself make application in this field, his own interest being in the stability of rotating fluid masses with astronomical application. He did not have doctoral students who followed the research in the field of stability and his own destiny was terribly tragic because of his suicide in 1918 . For several decades the theory of stability sank into complete oblivion.  The Russian-Soviet mathematician and mechanician Nikolay Gur'yevich Chetaev working at the Kazan Aviation Institute in the 1930s was the first who realized the incredible magnitude of the discovery made by A. M. Lyapunov. The contribution to the theory made by N. G. Chetaev was so significant that many mathematicians, physicists and engineers consider him Lyapunov's direct successor and the next-in-line scientific descendant in the creation and development of the mathematical theory of stability.

The interest in it suddenly skyrocketed during the Cold War period when the so-called "Second Method of Lyapunov" (see below) was found to be applicable to the stability of aerospace guidance systems which typically contain strong nonlinearities not treatable by other methods. A large number of publications appeared then and since in the control and systems literature.
More recently the concept of the Lyapunov exponent (related to Lyapunov's First Method of discussing stability) has received wide interest in connection with chaos theory. Lyapunov stability methods have also been applied to finding equilibrium solutions in traffic assignment problems.

Definition for continuous-time systems
Consider an autonomous nonlinear dynamical system

,

Suppose  has an equilibrium at  so that   then

 This equilibrium is said to be Lyapunov stable, if, for every , there exists a  such that, if , then for every  we have .
 The equilibrium of the above system is said to be asymptotically stable if it is Lyapunov stable and there exists  such that if , then .
 The equilibrium of the above system is said to be exponentially stable if it is asymptotically stable and there exist  such that if , then , for all .

Conceptually, the meanings of the above terms are the following:
 Lyapunov stability of an equilibrium means that solutions starting "close enough" to the equilibrium (within a distance  from it) remain "close enough" forever (within a distance  from it). Note that this must be true for any  that one may want to choose.
 Asymptotic stability means that solutions that start close enough not only remain close enough but also eventually converge to the equilibrium.
 Exponential stability means that solutions not only converge, but in fact converge faster than or at least as fast as a particular known rate .

The trajectory  is (locally) attractive if

  as  

That is, if x belongs to the interior of its stable manifold, it is asymptotically stable if it is both attractive and stable.  (There are examples showing that attractivity does not imply asymptotic stability. Such examples are easy to create using homoclinic connections.)

If the Jacobian of the dynamical system at an equilibrium happens to be a stability matrix (i.e., if the real part of each eigenvalue is strictly negative), then the equilibrium is asymptotically stable.

System of deviations
Instead of considering stability only near an equilibrium point (a constant solution ), one can formulate similar definitions of stability near an arbitrary solution . However, one can reduce the more general case to that of an equilibrium by a change of variables called a "system of deviations". Define , obeying the differential equation:

.

This is no longer an autonomous system, but it has a guaranteed equilibrium point at  whose stability is equivalent to the stability of the original solution .

Lyapunov's second method for stability
Lyapunov, in his original 1892 work, proposed two methods for demonstrating stability. The first method developed the solution in a series which was then proved convergent within limits. The second method, which is now referred to as the Lyapunov stability criterion or the Direct Method, makes use of a Lyapunov function V(x) which has an analogy to the potential function of classical dynamics. Consider a function  such that
   if and only if 
   if and only if 
Then V(x) is called a Lyapunov function and the system is stable in the sense of Lyapunov. (Note that  is required; otherwise for example  would "prove" that  is locally stable.) An additional condition called "properness" or "radial unboundedness" is required in order to conclude global stability. Global asymptotic stability (GAS) follows similarly.

It is easier to visualize this method of analysis by thinking of a physical system (e.g. vibrating spring and mass) and considering the energy of such a system. If the system loses energy over time and the energy is never restored then eventually the system must grind to a stop and reach some final resting state. This final state is called the attractor. However, finding a function that gives the precise energy of a physical system can be difficult, and for abstract mathematical systems, economic systems or biological systems, the concept of energy may not be applicable.

Lyapunov's realization was that stability can be proven without requiring knowledge of the true physical energy, provided a Lyapunov function can be found to satisfy the above constraints.

Definition for discrete-time systems
The definition for discrete-time systems is almost identical to that for continuous-time systems. The definition below provides this, using an alternate language commonly used in more mathematical texts.

Let (X, d) be a metric space and f : X → X a continuous function. A point x in X is said to be Lyapunov stable, if,

We say that x is asymptotically stable if it belongs to the interior of its stable set, i.e. if,

Stability for linear state space models
A linear state space model

,

This condition is equivalent to the following one:

is negative definite for some positive definite matrix .

Correspondingly, a time-discrete linear state space model

is asymptotically stable (in fact, exponentially stable) if all the eigenvalues of  have a modulus smaller than one.

This latter condition has been generalized to switched systems: a linear switched discrete time system (ruled by a set of matrices )

is asymptotically stable (in fact, exponentially stable) if the joint spectral radius of the set  is smaller than one.

Stability for systems with inputs

A system with inputs (or controls) has the form

where the (generally time-dependent) input u(t) may be viewed as a control, external input,
stimulus, disturbance, or forcing function.  It has been shown  that near to a point of equilibrium which is Lyapunov stable the system remains stable under small disturbances.  For larger input disturbances the study of such systems is the subject of control theory and applied in control engineering.  For systems with inputs, one must quantify the effect of inputs on the stability of the system.  The main two approaches to this analysis are BIBO stability (for linear systems) and input-to-state stability (ISS) (for nonlinear systems)

Example
This example shows a system where a Lyapunov function can be used to prove Lyapunov stability but cannot show asymptotic stability.
Consider the following equation, based on the Van der Pol oscillator equation with the friction term changed:

Let

so that the corresponding system is

The origin  is the only equilibrium point.
Let us choose as a Lyapunov function

which is clearly positive definite. Its derivative is

The equilibrium is Lyapunov stable but not asymptotically stable.

Barbalat's lemma and stability of time-varying systems
Assume that f is a function of time only.

For example, .
 Having  approaching a limit as  does not imply that . For example, .
 Having  lower bounded and decreasing implies it converges to a limit.

Barbalat's Lemma says:

An alternative version is as follows:

In the following form the Lemma is true also in the vector valued case:

The following example is taken from page 125 of Slotine and Li's book Applied Nonlinear Control.

Consider a non-autonomous system

This is non-autonomous because the input  is a function of time.  Assume that the input  is bounded.

Taking  gives 

Moreover, the invariant set theorem cannot be applied, because the dynamics is non-autonomous.

Using Barbalat's lemma:

.

This proves that the error converges.

See also
 Lyapunov function
 LaSalle's invariance principle
 Lyapunov–Malkin theorem
Markus–Yamabe conjecture
 Libration point orbit
 Hartman–Grobman theorem
 Perturbation theory

References

Further reading
 

 
 
 
 
 

Stability theory
Dynamical systems
Lagrangian mechanics
Three-body orbits